Dragoš is a village in the Bitola Municipality of North Macedonia. It used to be part of the former municipality of Bistrica and is located close to the Greek border.

Demographics
According to the 2002 census, the village had a total of 33 inhabitants. Ethnic groups in the village include:

Macedonians 33

References

External links
 Visit Macedonia

Villages in Bitola Municipality